Prescott House Museum is a historic house and gardens located in Starr's Point, Nova Scotia which is part of the Nova Scotia Museum. Built between 1812 and 1816 by Charles Ramage Prescott as the centrepiece of his country estate called Acacia Grove, it is one of the best preserved Georgian houses in Canada.

History
Prescott, a wealthy merchant from  Halifax, Nova Scotia purchased the land in 1811 when he took early retirement from his shipping and trading career. He used Acacia Grove as a base for agricultural experiments, importing a wide variety of plants, especially apple varieties which he shared freely with area growers. When Prescott died in 1859, the house was purchased and maintained for several decades by the Kaye family. However later owners neglected the house and by the 1890s, it fell into ruin. In 1931 the property was purchased by Mary Allison Prescott, the great granddaughter of Charles Prescott. She restored the house and lived in it with her two sisters until 1970. They donated the house to the Province of Nova Scotia in 1971.

The house was designated a National Historic Site of Canada in 1969.  It is also a Provincially Registered Property under the province's Heritage Property Act.

Museum
The house is operated as part of the Nova Scotia Museum system and explores Prescott's life, Georgian architecture, the apple industry and the lives of the Prescott sisters. Fully restored rooms depict both the Georgian period of Charles Prescott's time and the later era of the 1930s and 40s when it was restored by the Prescott sisters. Open from May to October, the museum offers guided tours of the period rooms and hosts a variety of regular events to interpret the house and its gardens for families and children.

References

 Archibald, Stephen and Sheila Stevenson, Heritage Houses of Nova Scotia, Formac Publishing, Halifax (2004), p. 21
 Pacey, Elizabeth and Alan Comiter, Landmarks: Historic Buildings of Nova Scotia, Nimbus Publishing Halifax (1994), p. 32-33

External links
Prescott House Museum Website
"Prescott House", Nova Scotia Apples website
Photographs of Prescott House Museum

Museums in Kings County, Nova Scotia
Historic house museums in Nova Scotia
National Historic Sites in Nova Scotia
Houses completed in 1816
Museums established in 1971
Georgian architecture in Canada
Nova Scotia Museum
Estate gardens in Canada
1971 establishments in Canada